Alpaslan Öztürk (born 16 July 1993) is a Belgian-born Turkish professional footballer who plays as a right-back and midfielder for Eyüpspor and the Turkey national team.

Öztürk began his club career with Beerschot before joining English club Birmingham City, where he spent two years without appearing for the first team. He then returned to Beerschot, making his first-team debut in January 2012. After the club's 2013 relegation from the Pro League and subsequent bankruptcy left all their players out of contract, Öztürk signed for Standard Liège. He was loaned to Turkish Süper Lig club Kasımpaşa for one-and-a-half seasons before spending 2015–16 on loan at another Turkish club, Eskişehirspor. Following a short spell at Elazığspor, he signed for Göztepe in 2018.

He has represented Turkey, the country of his parents, at under-18, under-20, under-21, and A2 level, and Belgium, the country of his birth, at under-18, under-19, and under-21 level.

Club career

Early life and career
Öztürk was born in Antwerp, Belgium, and is of Turkish descent. He was part of the youth system at Berchem Sport before joining Germinal Beerschot at the age of 12, and then moved to England to join Birmingham City's Youth Academy in 2009. He played regularly in the under-18 and reserve teams, and in March 2011, was given a first-team squad number prior to the FA Cup sixth-round tie against Bolton Wanderers. In the absence through injury of Stephen Carr and Roger Johnson, and with Liam Ridgewell not fit enough to start, Öztürk was named among the substitutes for that game, but remained unused.

He was part of the Birmingham squad for their 2011 pre-season visit to Ireland, and played the second half of the friendly against Cork City. In August 2011, he left the club. It was reported that no agreement could be reached between Birmingham and Beerschot on a mutually acceptable way to structure a compensation fee.

Beerschot
Öztürk returned to Beerschot for the 2011–12 season. Playing as a midfielder rather than the right back position he usually occupied at Birmingham, he was an unused substitute for the first team's visit to Standard Liège in January 2012, made his debut as Beerschot beat K.V. Kortrijk in the Belgian Cup, and played the full 90 minutes on his first Belgian Pro League appearance as Beerschot beat Cercle Brugge 4–0 on 21 January. In February, his contract was extended to June 2016. Beerschot were relegated from the Pro League at the end of the 2012–13 season, and the club was subsequently declared bankrupt, which left the players out of contract.

Standard Liège
As a free agent, Öztürk signed a five-year contract with Standard Liège on 13 June 2013. He made his Standard debut in the starting eleven against Lierse on 4 August, producing a calm, assured performance in his preferred position of defensive midfield. Öztürk kept his place, and contributed to Standard's qualification for the Europa League group stages.

Kasımpaşa
Öztürk spent the second half of the 2013–14 season on loan to Turkish Süper Lig club Kasımpaşa. He started one match, a goalless draw away to Kayserispor, and made nine substitute appearances. In July, he rejoined Kasımpaşa, again on loan, for the 2014–15 season; the agreement included an option to make the transfer permanent. He appeared in 23 Süper Lig matches that season, but the move was not made permanent.

Eskişehirspor
He joined another Süper Lig club, Eskişehirspor, on loan for the 2015–16 season; again, the deal included an option to purchase. After making 15 league appearances, he was dropped from the squad in early March 2016 and never played again. In an interview with a Turkish website, Öztürk said he was training on his own and, with the club in financial difficulties, the players were not receiving their wages regularly. He made it clear that he wanted to return to Standard, and even if Eskişehirspor took up their option, he had no interest in staying.

Return to Standard
Ahead of the 2016–17 season, Öztürk took part in pre-season training with Standard.

Galatasaray
He signed a three-year contract with Galatasaray in the 2021–22 season.

Eyüpspor (loan)
He signed a one-year lease agreement with Eyüpspor on 30 June 2022.

International career
Öztürk made his international debut for the Turkey under-18 team in November 2010, in the starting eleven for a friendly match against their German counterparts, and came off the substitutes' bench against the same opponents two days later. In January 2011, he was selected for his native Belgium's under-18 team, and was in the starting eleven for two friendlies against France U18. He played twice more a few weeks later in friendlies against Estonia U18, and twice more in the 2011 Slovakia Cup.

In August 2011, Öztürk moved up to the Belgium under-19 team, becoming a regular selection both in friendly matches and in qualification for the 2012 UEFA under-19 championships. He scored his first international goal in a 4–1 friendly defeat of Turkey on 7 September.

In February 2013, Öztürk was called up to the Turkish under-21 squad for the upcoming match against Norway, but played no part. He did appear for Turkey's under-20 side in two friendly matches against their Portuguese counterparts in March 2013 – in the first of the two, he scored the second goal in a 2–1 win. Selected for Turkey's squad for the 2013 FIFA U-20 World Cup, he started all three of Turkey's group matches and their second-round defeat to eventual winners France. Öztürk made his under-21 debut for Turkey in their opening qualification match for the 2015 European championships, a 4–0 home win against Malta. He made his debut for Turkey national football team on 1 September 2021 in a World Cup qualifier against Montenegro.

Personal

Öztürk was born and raised in Belgium by Turkish immigrants.

References
Infobox statistics
 
General

External links
 
 
 
 
 
 
 
 

1993 births
Living people
Footballers from Antwerp
Turkish footballers
Turkey under-21 international footballers
Turkey youth international footballers
Turkey international footballers
Belgian people of Turkish descent
Belgian footballers
Belgium under-21 international footballers
Belgium youth international footballers
Association football defenders
Association football midfielders
Birmingham City F.C. players
Beerschot A.C. players
Standard Liège players
Kasımpaşa S.K. footballers
Eskişehirspor footballers
Belgian Pro League players
Göztepe S.K. footballers
Süper Lig players
TFF First League players
Galatasaray S.K. footballers
Eyüpspor footballers